Washington Boulevard is a major arterial road in Arlington County, Virginia and Washington, DC. The western portion is designated State Route 237 (SR 237), the eastern portion is State Route 27 (SR 27) and the center is an arterial road with no designation. A short portion of the road enters the District of Columbia on Columbia Island, providing a connection between SR 27 and the Arlington Memorial Bridge.

Route description

West of the Pentagon

Washington Boulevard begins as a one-way residential street heading westbound in East Falls Church, parallel to Interstate 66 (Custis Memorial Parkway). It provides an ramp to I-66 west as part of the highway's exit 69. At an intersection with Lee Highway (U.S. Route 29 and State Route 237), SR 237 transitions to Washington Boulevard and Fairfax Drive (the eastbound road in the one-way pair on the other side of I-66. Shortly east of this intersection, the two roads merge and Washington Boulevard continues as two-way undivided road. An intersection with Sycamore Street provides access to the East Falls Church Washington Metro station, which serves the Orange and Silver Lines.

Continuing east in Arlington County, Washington Boulevard intersects Glebe Road (State Route 120) as it enters Ballston. Here, SR 237 turns south onto Glebe Road. Glebe Road also provides access to I-66 east at exit 71, just north of Washington Boulevard. The boulevard now continues east without a signed route number, passing through the Virginia Square and Clarendon neighborhoods. In downtown Clarendon, the road intersects the one-way pair of Wilson Boulevard and Clarendon Boulevard. It also intersects SR 237 once again, this time at 10th Street North.

Beyond 10th Street, Washington Boulevard takes a more southern direction and enters the Lyon Park neighborhood. At a cloverleaf interchange with Arlington Boulevard (U.S. Route 50), Washington Boulevard picks up the designation for State Route 27, an east–west route despite the boulevard's current north–south trajectory. The entirety of SR 27 is a limited access road, with access to and from the road via only ramps and no intersections or traffic signals. An interchange with Second Street South provides to the Penrose neighborhood as well as the historic Fort Myer, now part of Joint Base Myer–Henderson Hall. Washington Boulevard also crosses the Columbia Pike (State Route 244) by way of the Freedmans Village Bridge. The road then takes a more east–west trajectory as it approaches the Mixing Bowl.

Mixing Bowl

The Mixing Bowl interchange connects Washington Boulevard with Interstate 395, the Shirley Highway. Eastbound Washington Boulevard can access both directions of I-395, while westbound traffic can only access I-395 south and the highway's reversible HOV lanes. The Mixing Bowl also has ramps to and from Arlington Ridge Road and Army Navy Drive, providing access to Pentagon City.

East of the interchange, Washington Boulevard turns north, meeting the eastern terminus of SR 244 at a partial cloverleaf interchange which also serves the south parking lot of The Pentagon, the Pentagon Memorial, and the United States Air Force Memorial. The boulevard continues north, serving as the eastern border of Arlington National Cemetery, before meeting State Route 110 (Richmond Highway) and the Pentagon North Parking lot at two nearby interchanges. The southbound (SR 27 westbound) exit to SR 110 south is signed as "TO I-395 north." North of here, Washington Boulevard crosses the Boundary Channel and enters the District of Columbia.

District of Columbia

Washington Boulevard exists for just  within the District, and road signage is scarce. The road travels north on Columbia Island, a National Park Service-maintained island within the District of Columbia despite it being located west of the Potomac River. The road has an interchange with the George Washington Memorial Parkway, with both directions of Washington Boulevard accessing the southbound parkway and the northbound parkway accessing the northbound boulevard. Just before the eastern terminus, the boulevard has an exit ramp that travels underneath the Arlington Memorial Bridge bound for the northbound parkway and US 50 west, before coming to an end at Arlington Memorial Circle, which accesses both the Memorial Bridge and Arlington National Cemetery.

History

The first section of Washington Boulevard was built just north of the Fairfax line of the Washington, Arlington and Falls Church between Falls Church and Clarendon in the 1920s. Between I-395 and Clarendon, Washington Boulevard was built on the right-of-way of the Washington, Arlington and Falls Church's South Arlington Branch in the late 1920s. The road was completed when the section from I-395 to Memorial Circle was built in the early 1940s.

September 11 attacks

On September 11, 2001, many commuters and drivers witnessed the hijacked American Airlines Flight 77 as it passed directly over Washington Boulevard and crashed into The Pentagon. Witnesses included Daryl Donley and Steve Riskus, both who took some of the first photographs after the plane crashed. As the plane passed over Washington Boulevard, it clipped several light poles; one light pole landed on the windshield of a taxicab driven by Lloyd England. That section of Washington Boulevard was closed for several weeks following the attacks.

Other incidents
At 3:40 a.m. on December 22, 2004, a tank truck overturned and exploded on Washington Boulevard at the interchange with I-395, near the Pentagon. The accident killed the driver, and sparked initial concerns that this explosion was another terrorist attack. The driver was headed to the Citgo gas station, near the Pentagon.

Improvements

In 2012, work began on a new bridge over Columbia Pike, which had been in planning since 1990. The original bridge dated from the 1940s. Due to budget constraints, the bridge had to be scaled down, lacking the bicycle paths and other touches originally planned. Work was completed in December 2015 and the bridge was dedicated as the "Freedmans Village Bridge" in September 2015.

In 2015, VDOT began the work of replacing the bridge over Route 110/Richmond Highway that was built in 1941. Work lasted until May of 2019 when the longer, higher and wider replacement bridge was completed. It was then named Arlington Veterans Bridge.

Shared use path
The Washington Boulevard Trail is a pair of shared use paths along the south side of the Boulevard between the Mount Vernon Trail on Columbia Island and the Arlington Boulevard Trail in Arlington.

The first of the two trails built was the easternmost section from the Mount Vernon Trail to Columbia Pike. It runs  through Lady Bird Johnson Park and then along the edge of the Pentagon and the National 9/11 Pentagon Memorial. The trail was originally built concurrent with the Pentagon in 1943 as an unpaved path, but in 1993 the county made plans to pave and grade it. This work was completed in the late 1990s. In 2006, as part of a renovation of the Pentagon following 9/11, a section was built adjacent to the new security wall. Another section along the Pentagon Memorial was built in conjunction with that project and opened in September 2008. From 2015 to 2018, VDOT rebuilt the Washington Boulevard Bridge over Route 110, later renamed Arlington Veterans Bridge, with a 14' side path replacing the old, narrow sidewalk. At the same time they built the section of trail from the Pentagon parking lot ramp to the security wall section built in 2006 and built a short section from the Pentagon Memorial to Columbia Pike. That work was completed in December 2017.

It was first proposed in Arlington's 1994 Bicycle Transportation Plan. The first section of the trail, from Arlington Boulevard to Walter Reed Road, was built in 2009–2010. The section, from Walter Reed to Rolfe St. was built between February and November 2018, with the final ribbon cutting on the trail occurring on November 30, 2018.

In the future, the two sections are to be connected by a path built in conjunction with a project to expand Arlington National Cemetery. That project will realign Columbia Pike and add a sidepath to connect the two pieces of the Washington Boulevard Trail, as well as a section of sidepath built between Rolfe and Orme Streets in 2015 as part of the Freedmans Village Bridge.

Major intersections

References 

Transportation in Arlington County, Virginia
Roads in Virginia
Boulevards in the United States